Bălțești is a commune in Prahova County, Muntenia, Romania. It is composed of three villages: Bălțești, Izești and Podenii Vechi.

References

External links
Primaria Baltesti - Link to Local authorities

Communes in Prahova County
Localities in Muntenia